WCYN-FM (102.3 MHz) was a commercial FM radio station licensed to Cynthiana, Kentucky, and serving the Lexington metropolitan area.  The station simulcast co-owned 101.5 WLXX in Richmond, Kentucky.  WCYN-FM and WLXX played adult hits using the syndicated JACK-FM radio format.   WCYN-FM was last owned by Cumulus Media.  The studios and offices were in Kincaid Towers on Vine Street in Lexington.

WCYN-FM was silent from March 7, 2017, to sometime in 2019, due to the lack of an exciter. It returned to the air, simulcasting sister station WLXX, using the slogan "Playing What We Want!" The playlist was mostly rock hits from the 1980s, 90s and early 2000s, but included pop and novelty hits from the last 50 years. Unlike most music stations, WCYN-FM, along with WLXX, did not have DJs, but used the prerecorded voice of Howard Cogan to make humorous and sometimes sarcastic quips. The station’s final Program Director was Patrick Scott.

WCYN's license was surrendered to the Federal Communications Commission and cancelled on May 19, 2022.

References

External links

CYN-FM
Radio stations established in 1970
Radio stations disestablished in 2022
1970 establishments in Kentucky
2022 disestablishments in Kentucky
Defunct radio stations in the United States
CYN-FM
Cynthiana, Kentucky